MS-DOS 4.0 was a multitasking release of MS-DOS developed by Microsoft based on MS-DOS 2.0. Lack of interest from OEMs, particularly IBM (who previously gave Microsoft multitasking code on IBM PC DOS included with TopView), led to it being released only in a scaled-back form. It is sometimes referred to as European MS-DOS 4.0, as it was primarily used there. It should not be confused with PC DOS 4.00 or MS-DOS 4.01 and later, which did not contain the multi-tasking features.

History 
Apricot Computers pre-announced "MS-DOS 4.0" in early 1986, and Microsoft demonstrated it in September of that year at a Paris trade show. However, only a few European OEMs, such as SMT Goupil and International Computers Limited (ICL), actually licensed releases of the software. In particular, IBM declined the product, concentrating instead on improvements to MS-DOS 3.x and their new joint development with Microsoft to produce OS/2.

As a result, the project was scaled back, and only those features promised to particular OEMs were delivered. In September 1987, a version of multi-tasking MS-DOS 4.1 was reported to be developed for the ICL DRS Professional Workstation (PWS). No further releases were made once the contracts had been fulfilled.

In July 1988, IBM announced "IBM DOS 4.0", an unrelated product continuing from DOS 3.3 and 3.4, leading to initial conjecture that Microsoft might release it under a different version number. However, Microsoft eventually released it as "MS-DOS 4.0", with a MS-DOS 4.01 following quickly to fix issues many had reported.

Features 
As well as minor improvements such as support for the New Executable file format, the key feature of the release was its support for preemptive multitasking. This did not use the protected mode available on 80386 processors, but allowed specially-written programs to continue executing in a "background mode", where they had no access to user input and output until returned to the foreground. The OS was reported to include a time-sliced scheduler and interprocess communication via pipes and shared memory. This limited form of multitasking was considered to be more useful in a server rather than workstation environment, particularly coupled with MS-Net 2.0, which was released simultaneously.

Other limitations of MS-DOS 3.0 remained, including the inability to use memory above 640 KB, and this contributed to the product's lack of adoption, particularly in light of the need to write programs specifically targeted at the new environment.

INT 21h/AH=87h can be used to distinguish between the multitasking MS-DOS 4.x and the later MS-DOS/PC DOS 4.x issues.

Microsoft president Jon Shirley described it as a "specialized version" and went as far as saying "maybe we shouldn't have called it DOS 4.0", although it's not clear whether this was always the intention, or if a more enthusiastic response from OEMs would have resulted in it being the true successor to DOS 3.x. The marketing positioned it as an additional option between DOS 3.x for workstations, and Xenix for higher-end servers and multiuser systems.

External commands
MS-DOS Version 4.10.20 supports the following external commands:

 APPEND
 ASSIGN
 ATTRIB
 BACKUP
 CHKDSK
 COMMAND
 DEBUG
 DETACH
 DISKCOMP
 DISKCOPY
 EDLIN
 EXE2BIN
 FC
 FDISK
 FIND
 FORMAT
 GRAFTABL
 GRAPHICS
 GWBASIC
 HEADPARK
 INSTALLX
 JOIN
 LABEL
 LINK4
 MODE
 MORE
 MOUS
 PERM0
 PRINT
 QUEUER
 RECOVER
 REPLACE
 RESTORE
 SETUP
 SHARE
 SORT
 SUBST
 SYS
 TREE
 XCOPY

See also

 Concurrent DOS, Concurrent DOS 286, Concurrent DOS 386 - Concurrent CP/M-based multiuser multitasking OS with DOS emulator since 1983
DOS Plus - Concurrent PC DOS-based multitasking OS with DOS emulator since 1985
DoubleDOS - enabled limited multitasking by partitioning a PC into two simultaneous DOS sessions
Novell DOS, OpenDOS, DR-DOS - successors of DOS Plus with preemptive multitasking in VDMs since 1993
FlexOS - successor of Concurrent DOS 286 since 1986
4680 OS, 4690 OS - successors of FlexOS 286 and FlexOS 386 since 1986
Multiuser DOS - successor of Concurrent DOS 386 since 1991
REAL/32 - successor of Multiuser DOS since 1995
 PC-MOS/386 - multiuser multitasking DOS clone since 1987
 VM/386 - multiuser multitasking DOS environment since 1987
 TopView - DOS-based multitasking environment since 1985
 DESQview, DESQview/X - DOS-based multitasking environment since 1985
 Virtual DOS machine
 Datapac Australasia

References

Further reading
 
 
 
 

1986 software
Discontinued Microsoft operating systems
Disk operating systems
DOS variants
Proprietary operating systems
Assembly language software